Belarusian–Kosovar relations are foreign relations between Belarus and Kosovo.

History 
In February 2008, Belarusian President Alexander Lukashenko wrote in a letter to Serbian President Boris Tadić that "Belarus expresses its solidarity with the Serbians' intention to defend their sovereignty and territorial integrity". The National Assembly of Belarus had issued a statement condemning the declaration of independence and encouraged all nations to call the move "illegal" under international law.

The Foreign Ministry of Belarus published a statement saying "that the settlement of the Kosovo and Metochia status should progress under international law, based on UN Security Council resolution 1244 (of 1999) which is a fundamental document for the Kosovo settlement certifying the sovereignty and territorial integrity of the Republic of Serbia, and based on the key provisions of the UN Charter and Helsinki Final Act, with the essential role of the UN Security Council bearing a predominant responsibility for safeguarding international peace and security".

In a 3 December 2009 hearing at the ICJ, the Belarusian delegation said that secession by international law was allowed only in former colonies, or in cases where the minority population was oppressed for a long period of time and was denied the participation in government, and that the situation in Kosovo had not met these criteria traditionally interpreted as the right for "external" self-determination. The delegation continued saying that the internal law of Serbia, as well as UNSC resolutions, were satisfactory for the "internal" self-determination of the Albanian population.

In May 2012 the Belarusian ambassador to Serbia, Uladzimir Chushaw, said that Belarus will never recognise the independence of Kosovo. He was quoted as saying, "The Kosovo wounds are hurting us very much."

See also 

 Foreign relations of Belarus
 Foreign relations of Kosovo
 Belarus–Serbia relations

Notes

References 

Kosovo